The 2000 congressional elections in Indiana were elections for Indiana's delegation to the United States House of Representatives, which occurred along with congressional elections nationwide on November 7, 2000. Republicans held a majority of Indiana's delegation over the Democrats, 6-4. This was the last time Representatives were elected using the U.S. congressional districts based on the 1990 U.S. Census.

Results
The following are the final results from the Secretary of State of Indiana.

Overview

See also
2000 United States House of Representatives elections

References

2000
Indiana
2000 Indiana elections